Pustuloporidae is a family of bryozoans belonging to the order Cyclostomatida.

Genera:
 Bientalophora Borg, 1944
 Pustulopora de Blainville, 1830
 Umbrellina Reuss, 1872

References

Cyclostomatida